This list of Australian heavyweight boxing champions is a table showing the boxers who have won the Australian professional heavyweight championship. The title has been administered by the Australian National Boxing Federation (previously the Australian Boxing Federation) since 1965, and prior to that by Stadiums Limited.

A champion will often voluntarily relinquish the title in order to fight for a higher-ranked championship, such as the world. Where the date on which a champion relinquished the title is unclear, the date of his final defence is shown.

r – Champion relinquished title.
s – Champion stripped of title.
i – Interim Champion of title.

Notes

See also

List of Australian female boxing champions
List of Australian cruiserweight boxing champions

List of Australian middleweight boxing champions

Boxing in Australia

References

External links
boxrec

Heavy